Gabriel Romero (born in Mexico City) is a Mexican actor best known for his ground-breaking role as Fernandito, the first openly gay character on Spanish-language television, on the Telemundo sitcom Los Beltrán and for his role as Marco on the here! original series Dante's Cove. Romero is bisexual.

Career
Romero earned a Bachelor of Fine Arts degree in Theatre from the University of Southern California in 1993. He is a musician, having taken up piano at the age of six, and has trained as a painter, dancer and gymnast.

Romero starred in Los Beltrán as Dr. Fernando "Fernandito" Salazar, an openly gay surgeon involved in a long-term relationship with a man. The series was the first on Spanish-language television to feature an openly gay character and the first to feature a same-sex marriage when Fernandito and his partner Kevin wed. Los Beltrán was nominated for two GLAAD Media Awards, the first Spanish-language program to be so honored. The series also won the National Council of La Raza Alma Award and an Imagen Award for Best Comedy Series.

In 2006, Romero joined the cast for the second season of the gay horror series Dante's Cove, playing Marco, the owner of a trendy club on the island called H2Eau. As the season unfolded, Marco was drawn into conflict with Colin, owner of a local after-hours club, and Kai, the island's amoral "fixer."

He has an extensive background in live theatre and commercial voice-over work. Romero currently resides in Los Angeles.

Filmography

References

External links
 
 Romero interview with Instinct magazine

Bisexual male actors
Mexican LGBT actors
Living people
Male actors from Mexico City
USC School of Dramatic Arts alumni
Year of birth missing (living people)